Sampaga is a village in Sampaga district, Mamuju Regency in West Sulawesi province. The district covers an area of 110.27 km2 and had a population of 15,925 at the 2020 Census.

Climate
Sampaga has a tropical rainforest climate (Af) with heavy rainfall year-round.

References

Populated places in West Sulawesi